Notre-Dame-des-Champs is a Roman Catholic church located in the 6th arrondissement of Paris. The church is named after the Blessed Virgin Mary under the title of Our Lady of the Fields.

History 
Originally located on the site of the church was a Roman temple dedicated to the god Mercury. After the Christianization of France, the temple was dedicated to the Blessed Virgin Mary and was named Notre-Dame-des-Vignes. Robert II made additions to the church and rededicated it to both the Virgin Mary and Saint Denis. The church was later made into a priory by the Benedictine monks of Marmoutier Abbey, renaming it Notre-Dame-des-Champs in honor of Our Lady of the Fields.

In 1604 the Benedictines ceded the priory to Princess Catherine Gonzaga, Duchess of Orleans-Longueville who installed Carmelites from Spain. This was the Carmelite convent where both Louise de La Vallière and Françoise-Athénaïs de Rochechouart, Marquise de Montespan both retired from the French court and entered religious life.

During the French Revolution the convent was closed and the church destroyed. In 1802 the Carmelite Order bought back a small portion of the estate. A small chapel dedicated to Notre-Dame-des-Champs was built, along with a new cloister and living quarters. The order left in 1906.

In 1858 a temporary wooden chapel was built as a neighborhood parish. The current structure was built by Eugène Bonté, Léon Ginain, and Gustave Eiffel in the Romanesque style. The foundation stone was laid on 17 March 1867. The stone came from quarries in Châtillon, Hauts-de-Seine. After being interrupted by the Franco-Prussian War in 1870, the completed church was blessed on 31 October 1876. On 25 March 1912 the church was consecrated by Archbishop Léon-Adolphe Amette of Paris.

References 

Convents in Paris
Shrines to the Virgin Mary
Roman Catholic churches in the 6th arrondissement of Paris
Romanesque architecture in France
Roman Catholic churches completed in 1876
19th-century Roman Catholic church buildings in France